The following is an incomplete list of caves in Spain:

Overview
Spain is a country with many caves. The most famous Spanish caves are:
 Cave of Altamira, in Cantabria, famous for its Upper Paleolithic paintings.
 Cuevas del Drach, on Majorca, containing one of the largest subterranean lakes in the world.
 Gruta Helada de Casteret (Grotte Casteret), a well-known limestone ice cave discovered by Norbert Casteret and family.
 Ojo Guareña, an enormous subterranean karst system, second only to the Mortillano system in terms of length.

There are many more:

Caves by depth (m) 
 -1.589 m Torca del Cerro del Cuevón - Torca de la Saxifragas (Asturias)
 -1.507 m Sima de la Cornisa - Torca Magali (León)
 -1.441 m Sistema del Trave (Asturias)
 -1.408 m Illaminako Ateeneko Leizea (BU.56) (Navarre/Huesca)
 -1.349 m (-1.338+11) Sistema Arañonera (Foratón/S-1/Camí de l'Ara/T-1/Santa Elena) (Huesca)
 -1.342 m Sistema de la Piedra de San Martín (Zuberoa, France - Navarre, Spain)
 -1.255 m Torca de los Rebecos (T.27) (Asturias)
 -1.252 m Pozo del Madejuno (León)
 -1.203 m Torca Jou sin Tierre (CS-9) (Cantabria)
 -1.187 m Piedras Verdes (PC-26) (Asturias)
 -1.169 m Torca del Cueto de los Senderos (Cantabria)
 -1.167 m Torca Idoúbeda (Asturias)
 -1.151 m Sistema de klas fuentes de Escuain (Sistema Badalona) (Huesca)
 -1.135 m Sistema del Jitu (Asturias)
 -1.112 m (-1101+11) Sistema de las Nieves (Málaga)
 -1.060 m Sistema  Tormenta -  La Texa (Asturias)
 -1.028 m Sistema Castil/ Carbonal  (Asturias)
 -1.022 m (-1017 +5) Torca Urriello (Asturias)
 -1.020 m Torca La MONDA (L652) (León)
 -1.009 m Sistema de Lechineres (Huesca)
 -972 m Pozo de Cuetalbo (M.2) (León)
 -956 m Torca Tortorios (Asturias)
 -949 m (-944, +5) Pozo del Llastral (León)
 -939 m Pozu de Cabeza Muxa (Asturias)
 -935 m Pozo Vega Huerta (M921) (León)
 -910 m Torca del Jou de Cerredo (Asturias)
 -903 m Sistema del Jou de la Canal Parda (A.30- A.24 - A.25 - A.1) (Asturias)
 -887 m Pozo Trasllamrión (CI.10-LL.8) (León)
 -863 m Pozu del Porru la Capilla (Asturias)
 -846 m Torca de Cabeza Llambrera (Sil de Oliseda) (León)
 -845 m Sistema de Garma Ciega-Bloque-Cellagua-Sombrero-Mazo Chico- (Cantabria)
 -836 m Sima de la Padiorna (Cantabria)
 -831 m Torca del Cueto de los Calabreros (Cantabria)
 -830 m Sima C.9 del Torrente da la Payon (Huesca)
 -819 m Sima AN8 (AN.8-AN.9) (Navarre)
 -815 m Cueva Coventosa (Cantabria)
 -814 m Sistema del Gandarra (Cantabria)
 -814 m Sistema Partacua (P-6) (Huesca)
 -811 m Pozu JULTAYU (Pozo del Ojo de la Bruja/27) (Asturias)
 -810 m Sistema de CEMBA VIEYA (Asturias)
 -806 m Torca del VALLE DEL AGUA (Asturias)
 -803 m Torca LA HORCADINA (L.6) (León)
 -800 m Sima PRESTÁ (Málaga)
 -798 m Pozo BAJO DEL SEDO (León)
 -792 m Torca de la MINA TERE (Cantabria)
 -758 m Torca TEJERA (Asturias)
 -740 m Sistema ANIALARRA (AN.51-AN.3-AN.6) (Navarre)
 -736 m Torca de CARNIZOSO (CZ.3) (Asturias)
 -736 m Sistema del CANALON DE LOS DESVIOS (F.15 -F.17-F.18- Pozo B-12) (Asturias)
 -727 m (-690+37) Sima de COTALBIN (K-903) (León)
 -723 m Torca del PICU BORU (Cantabria)
 -717 m Sima de UKERDI ABAJO (UK.4) (Navarre)
 -714 m (-607 +107) Cueva BUCHAQUERA (Huesca)
 -690 m Torca LLOROSA (Asturias)
 -682 m Torca de la NIEVE (2N) (Cantabria)
 -675 m Pozu JOCEJERRERU (Asturias)
 -660 m Sima J.A.17-J.A.18 (Asturias)
 -655 m Sistema del CONJURTAO (Asturias)
 -654 m Pozo los JOYOS de CUEVA PALACIOS (Asturias)
 -650 m Pozo de la CELADA (León)
 -650 m Sima del AIRE (Málaga)
 -650 m FISURA CHICA (Asturias)
 -644 m Sistema de la VERDILLUENGA (C.3) (Asturias)
 -644 m Sistema de la MINA SARA (Cantabria)
 -640 m Grallera de PICO FENEZ (Huesca)
 -640 m Pozu los GORRINOS-Pozu'l PRAU LA FUENTE (Asturias)
 -640 m (-627+13) Sistema GÜEYO FRESCO / ESPELUNGA del MEDIODIA (Huesca)
 -634 m Pozu'l TRAVE ROLAMUELA (Asturias)
 -622 m (-412, +210) Sistema del MORTERO DE ASTRANA (Cantabria)
 -619 m Pozu del JOU LUENGU (Asturias)
 -614 m Red de TONEYO (Asturias)
 -613 m Torca del LLAGU LAS MOÑETAS (Asturias)
 -608 m Torca de la TORRE DE ALTAIZ (Cantabria)
 -605 m Sistema del ALTO TEJUELO (Red del Alto Tejuelo-Riañón-los Moros-Cotero-la Canal-Torcón del Haya) (Cantabria)
 -604 m Grallar de SARRONAL (Huesca)
 -601 m Sima A-8 de Armeña (Huesca)
 -598 m Grallera del TALLON (Huesca)
 -597 m Pozu CEBOLLEDA (Asturias)
 -594 m Pozu JORCADA BLANCA-Pozu LAS PERDICES (Asturies)
 -594 m Torca del MOGU (JI.9) (Asturias)
 -589 m Torca de LAS PASADAS (Cantabria)
 -585 m Pozo de la AGUJA de ENOL (Asturias)
 -582 m Pozu del REDONDU (Asturias)
 -580 m Sistema SABADELL (Huesca)
 -576 m ORMAZARRETAKO Leizea II-LARRETXIKIKO LeizeaII (Navarre)
 -571 m Sistema de la BARGADERA (LLeida)
 -570 m  Torca del SOTANO de la XANA (T.31) (Asturias)
 -563 m Sistema FÉLIX RUIZ DE ARCAUTE (Huesca)
 -547 m ILOBIKO LEZEA (Navarre)
 -546 m Sistema del ALBA (Huesca)
 -545 m Pozu de les CUERRIES (Asturias)
 -540 m Pozu de la TORRE DE ENMEDIO (Asturias)
 -535 m Sistema de la BRECHA DE ROLANDO (CS.8/TP.8) (Huesca)
 +535 m Cueva de la Nacimiento (Rio Urdon) (Cantabria)
 -532 m (-487+45) Cueva del HOYO SALCEDILLO (Cantabria)
 -530 m (-483+47) Torca del HOYO GRANDE (Cantabria)
 -527 m Sistema TONIO-CAYUELA (Cantabria)
 -527 m Complejo ATXURIAGA (sistema Artekona-Arenaza-Rosario 5) (Biscay)
 -522 m GAZTELUKO URZULOA I (Guipúzcoa)
 -522 m Sima del RIO DE UKERDI (Sima del Tobozo) (Navarre)
 -518 m Complejo VIENTO-SOBRADO (Sta. Cruz de Tenerife-Canarias)
 -517 m Sima del ACEBO (Cantabria)
 -510 m LANS (Navarre)
 -508 m Grallera del PUERTO DE GISTAÍN (Huesca)
 -507 m Torca M`ECAGÜEN (T.7) (Asturias)
 -505 m Sumidero del HOYO SALZOSO (Cantabria)
 -503 m Sima de la KIETUD (Huesca)
 -501 m Sima BUFONA (Huesca)
 -501 m Sima del Tejón (Cantabria)
 -497 m Sistema TIBIA - FRESCA (Cantabria)
 -490 m Pozu del PORRU de los GAZAPOZALES ( Pozu A.3) (Asturias)
 -488 m MAIKUTXEKO Leizea (Guipúzcoa)
 -483 m Torca de JORNOS II (Biscay)
 -477 m Cueva del VALLE (Red del SILENCIO) (Cantabria/Biscay)
 -471 m Torca de la MOLE (Cantabria)
 -460 m Sima A.11 DE ARMEÑA (Huesca)
 -460 m A.55 de ARMEÑA (Huesca)
 -460 m C.166 Cotiella (Huesca)
 -457 m (-451+6) Sistema de la PUNTA DE LAS OLAS (Huesca)
 -457 m (-423+34)  Pozo de los ANGUSTINOS (León)
 -456 m Torca de BRAÑARREDONDA (Cantabria)
 -455 m Simas FREU.3-Sima FR.3 DE AÑELARRA (Navarre)
 -453 m (-415 m, +38 m) Torca de los MORTEROS (Burgos)
 -452 m Torca de la HENDIDA ( S-33 ) (Cantabria)
 -450 m Torca’l TUBU (JA-30) (Asturias)
 -450 m (-432+18) Sima del FUEGO (F.64) (Asturias)
 -449 m Cueva del VIERRO (Asturias)
 -444 m GAZTELU ARROKO Leizea III (Guipúzcoa)
 -440 m El MORTERÓN (Morterón I del Hoyo Salzoso) (Cantabria)
 -436 m (+3 / -433) Torca de los CORRALES DEL TRILLO (Sistema Peña del Trillo - La Tramasquera) (Cantabria / Burgos)
 -430 m Pozu GRANDE DE LA TORREZUELA (Asturias)
 -429 m  Pozu les BARRASTROSES (G-13) (Asturias)
 -425 m (-420+5) Sima de LEIZEROLA (Z.17) (Navarre)
 -424 m Pozo Silvestre - Cueva de la Marniosa (Cantabria)
 -420 m Sima de la GARITA CIMERA (León)
 -420 m Torca del HOYO MEDIO (Cantabria)
 -419 m Pozo REBECA (p103) (León)
 -418 m Cueva de la HAZA (Cantabria)
 -418 m Pozu de la PORRA ALTIQUERA (Asturias)
 -415 m Cueva del FRAILE - Sima de la TARTRACITA (Huesca)
 -415 m Sistema del HAYAL DE PONATA (Álava-Biscay)
 -410 m Pozo de los NIÑOS (AN.506) (Navarre)
 -410 m Sima FORATATA (Huesca)
 -409 m Sumidero de LAS FOYAS (Huesca)
 -407 m Torca C (Torca del Camino) (Provisional) (Asturias)
 -403 m Pozu CHIZIDI (Sistema YA.1-HR.2) (Asturies)
 -402 m ORMAZARRETAKO Leizea I (Navarre)
 -402 m Sima del CORRAL CIEGO (DC.7) (Huesca)
 -402 m Torca de la HORCADA VERDE (Cantabria)
 -401 m Sima de los CUATRO CAMINOS (K.897) (León)
 -401 m Sima de MARBORE (Huesca)
 -400 m Sima de la HOYA DEL PORTILLO DE LARRA (Huesca)
 -400 m Sima de la PALANCA (León)
 -400 m Sistema de la CUBADA GRANDE (Burgos)
 -400 m TR.1 (Cantabria)
 -400 m Torca de la Cuerre (Cantabria)
 -396 m Sima de la BURRA (Navarre)
 -394 m Torca de la Canal del Valle (Cantabria)
 -390 m Torca del CARRIO (Cantabria)
 -387 m Sima de los CAMPANALES (Huesca)
 -385 m Pozo la LLERONA (León)
 -385 m Pozo de LEIZEROLA (Z.150) (Navarre)
 -383 m Sistema APESTEGIA (Navarre)
 -381 m Pozo de la REDONDINA (MS.2) (León)
 -380 m Sima del CABALLERO DE LA TRISTE FIGURA (Huesca)
 -376 m Torca la VEGA  ALISEDA (del Vasco) (Asturias)
 -374 m Sima de las CHOVAS (Palencia)
 -371 m Sima de la ZAPATILLA (Huesca)
 -370 m Sima de la TORRE DE MARBORE (Huesca)
 -370 m Sumidero de CALLEJA LAVALLE (Cantabria)
 -370 m Torca del VALLE del AGUA (VA-1) (Asturias)
 -368 m Torca de ACEBUCO (Asturias)
 -367 m Sima del TERNERO (K.901) (León)
 -365 m Sima C.2 del LLANO CARRERAS (Navarre)
 -361 m Torca del INFANZON (Asturias)
 -361 m Torca LA BARGA (Asturias)
 -360 m Avenc BERNAT RENOM (Huesca)
 -360 m Sima BU.4 DE BUDOGUIA (Navarre)
 -358 m Sumidero de la LUNADA (Burgos)
 -355 m Sima del PORTILLO DE ARRIBA (Navarre)
 -354 m PAGOMARIKO LEIZEA (Navarre)
 -354 m (-341 +13) Pozu LA CARBA (Asturias)
 -351 m EZKAURRE'KO LEIZEA (Navarre)
 -350 m Torca del HOYÓN II (Cantabria)
 -350 m Pozu VALDEPINU (V.13) (Asturias)
 -350 m Torca del FRAILIN (Asturias)
 -350 m Torca de los TORRALLOS VERDES (Agujerón de los Basares MS76) (León)
 -350 m Sima A-27 (Huesca)
 -350 m Sima A-69 (Huesca)
 -350 m Sima CS09 (Cantabria)
 -349 m Torca de los JOUS DEL AGUA (Asturias)
 -349 m Torca del Carlista (Cantabria-Biscay)
 -345 m LEIZEBELTZ (Guipúzcoa)
 -345 m Torca del TEJO (Cantabria)
 -345 m Pozu de la MAZADA (Asturias)
 -344 m Red del JUNJUMIA (Asturias)
 -344 m AN 211 (Navarre)
 -343 m Pozu Jou CABAU (Asturias)
 -341 m Sima de lo FAITO (F.135-F.136) (Huesca)
 -341 m Torca la MAZUELA (Biscay)
 -340 m LEIZE HAUNDIA II – SAROBE SAILAKO LEIZEA (Guipúzcoa)
 -340 m Sima de la GARMA DE LOS TRILLOS-VT62 (Cantabria)
 -340 m Sima S1 - S3 de ESPIGÜETE (Palencia)
 -337 m Sima de la CASA DE LOS PASTORES (Navarre)
 -335 m Pozo ARGÜELLES (León)
 -334 m Torca del CALERO DEL AGUA (Cantabria)
 -333 m Torca del RÉQUIEM DE LAS MOTAS (Cantabria)
 -333 m Torca JUANIN (Asturias)
 -330 m IÑERITZE (Biscay)
 -330 m Sima de la CUMA DE ANSU (Navarre)
 -327 m Pozo de la CANAL DE CHIZIDI (Pozo de los Machanes, RA.25) (Asturias)
 -327 m Torca de TEJES (Cantabria)
 -327 m Torca del SAPO (Cantabria)
 -327 m (+315/-12) Cova CUBERES (LLeida)
 -323 m Pozu los DESVIOS (Asturias)
 -322 m Red de les BARRASTROSES (Asturias)
 -322 m Sima del Turbón (T.7) (Huesca)
 -322 m Sima del VES (Palencia)
 -321 m (-312+9) Torca del TURBON DE LA PORRA (Cantabria)
 -320 m Sima C.110 del LLANO CARRERAS  (Navarre)
 -320 m Cigalera de l'OBAGA DE BALERAN (Lleida)
 -320 m URRIKOBASO’KO LEZANDI (Biscay)
 -319 m Torca de las FALSAS ESPERANZAS (Cantabria)
 -319 m RASA 98 (Cantabria)
 -318 m (-276 +42) Sima CEMA BLANCA (Huesca)
 -318 m Torca de MAZARRASA (Cantabria)
 -317 m (-296/+20) Pozo ALTO DE LA CHORROTA  (Huesca)
 -317 m Cova de SA CAMPANA (Balears)
 -317 m Sistema de la VEGA (Cantabria)
 -316 m Gralleros de SALINAS (Asturias)
 -316 m Sima de SOASO (S.8) (Huesca)
 -313 m Torca del HOYÓN (de Alisas) (Cantabria)
 -313 m Grallera de la FONTAZA (Huesca)
 -313 m Pozu TRES LA HAYADA (Asturias)
 -313 m Torca de la RAMAZOSA (Cantabria)
 -311 m Sima MANOLO PÉREZ (Málaga)
 -310 m Torca JOU de l’AGUA (Asturias)
 -310 m Torca de las CARCAVAS (Cantabria)
 -310 m C-118 Cotiella (Huesca)
 -310 m Pozo Castillo (Natacha) (Cantabria)
 -309 m (-301, +8) Pozo la DUERNONA (León)
 -307 m TXOMIN VIII (Biscay)
 -306 m DS CA 16 (Cantabria)
 -306 m Sima DE UKERDI ALTO (UK.311) (Navarre)
 -305 m Torca de CARLOS MIER (Asturias)
 -303 m Pozo ALFA.30 (León)
 -303 m Torca del REGATO CALERO II (Cantabria)
 -301 m Cueva del JABATO (Cantabria)
 -301 m Torca del SEGADOR (Cantabria)
 -300 m Gran Pozo de PROMEDIO (G.8) (Asturias)
 -300 m Pozu les PALOMBARES (Asturias)
 -300 m Red de CERVERIZ (H.4) (Asturias)
 -300 m Red del JAYAU (Asturias)
 -300 m Complejo de los JAMEOS (Cueva de los Verdes-Túnel de la Atlántida) (Isla Lanzarote/Las Palmas/Canarias)
 -300 m FD3/Mortillano (Cantabria)

Other caves
Caves of Monte Castillo
Cave of El Castillo
Cave of Las Chimeneas
Cave of Las Monedas
Cave of La Pasiega
Las Caldas cave (Asturias) - paleolithic site and nature reserve

By Autonomous communities
Caves in Cantabria

Unesco World Heritage Sites caves
Cave Art of Northern Spain
Cave Art of Iberian Mediterranean Basin
Cave Art of Siega Verde

See also 
 List of caves
 Speleology

External links
 FEE list of Spanish caves

 
Spain
Caves